Turner County Courthouse is a historic county courthouse in Ashburn, Georgia, the county seat of Turner County, Georgia. The Classical Revival building was designed by two Macon architects, Alexander Blair III (who also designed seven other Georgia courthouses) and Peter E. Dennis. The courthouse is located at 219 East College Avenue, close to several historic homes.

The courthouse was constructed in 1907-1908, shortly after the county was formed by an act of the Georgia Legislature on August 18, 1905, from parts of Dooly, Irwin, Wilcox, and Worth counties. Ashburn was designated the county seat when the county was formed. The courthouse has served as the county government's offices since that time. The Turner County Courthouse was added to the National Register of Historic Places on September 18, 1980. The courthouse underwent restorations in 1984 and 2001.

Architecture
The construction is of brick and stone, and the New Georgia Guide published by the University of Georgia Press describes the building as "impressive." While the other courthouses designed by Alexander Blair III reflect traditional Neoclassicism, the design of the Turner County Courthouse (like the Decatur County Courthouse) is characterized by Neoclassical variations. It features a more flamboyant style that reflect the influence of Neo-Georgian/Colonial Revival architecture, giving a historical atmosphere to the building, as well as a somewhat Italianate appearance. The courthouse is asymmetrical because it includes a three-story clock tower, located on the west side of the building. The clock was made by the E. Howard Watch & Clock Company. The courthouse still has the original tin tiles, popular when the building was constructed, as well as an upper balcony where, before desegregation, blacks were required to sit. A state historical marker, erected by the Georgia Historical Commission in 1954, is located on the courthouse lawn.

Gallery

See also
National Register of Historic Places listings in Turner County, Georgia

References

External links
 
Exterior photograph of the courthouse by Brian Brown of the Vanishing South Georgia blog
Another exterior photograph of the courthouse 
Exterior photo 1, exterior photo 2, exterior photo 3, clock tower photo - 2011 photographs by George Lansing Taylor Jr. hosted at the University of North Florida Digital Commons

Courthouses on the National Register of Historic Places in Georgia (U.S. state)
Buildings and structures in Turner County, Georgia
County courthouses in Georgia (U.S. state)
Government buildings completed in 1908
Neoclassical architecture in Georgia (U.S. state)
Clock towers in Georgia (U.S. state)
National Register of Historic Places in Turner County, Georgia
1908 establishments in Georgia (U.S. state)